László Vadnay (1904–1967), or Ladislaus Vadnai, was a Hungarian screenwriter. He worked in the United States for a number of years before returning to Hungary.

Selected filmography
 The Dream Car (1934)
 Everything for the Woman (1934)
 Car of Dreams (1935)
 Villa for Sale (1935)
 Fräulein Lilli (1936)
 Hotel Kikelet (1937)
 Josette (1938)
 Seven Sinners (1940)
 Flesh and Fantasy (1943)
 Uncertain Glory (1944)
 The Big Show-Off (1945)
 Copacabana (1947)
 No Time for Flowers (1952)
 I Love Melvin (1953)
 Ten Thousand Bedrooms (1957)
 It Happened in Athens (1962)
 Dime with a Halo (1963)

Bibliography
 McNulty, Thomas. Errol Flynn: The Life and Career. McFarland, 2004.
Uncle of Adam Carolla

References

External links
 

1904 births
1967 deaths
Male screenwriters
Hungarian male writers
Hungarian Jews
Writers from Budapest
20th-century Hungarian screenwriters